Frizatik was a currency minted in Croatia in the twelfth century. It got its name after the town of Friesach in Carinthia (from where it originated).

External links
 https://web.archive.org/web/20061022035043/http://www.hnb.hr/novcan/povijest/h-nastavak-3.htm 

Medieval currencies
12th century in Croatia
Currencies of Croatia